Laurie Stephens (born March 5, 1984) is an alpine monoskier who has spina bifida. She has won multiple medals for the United States at the Paralympics. She has also had success at the IPC Alpine Skiing World Cup.

Career
Laurie Stephens started skiing at age 12 on Loon Mountain in New Hampshire and then began racing 3 years later at age 15 when she became a member of Chris Devlin-Young's New England Disabled Ski Team. Stephens competes in 5 different skiing events which are the Downhill, Slalom, Giant Slalom, Super-G, and Super Combined. She has competed in 4 Paralympic games and 5 world championships. Her debut as a Paralympian was in 2006 and since she has competed in the 2010, 2014, and the 2018 games. She has won a total of 7 Paralympic medals (2 gold, 2 silver, and 3 bronze) and 7 world championship medals (1 gold, 3 silver, 3 bronze). Stephens was named the Paralympic Sportswoman of the Year in 2006 by the United States Olympic Committee. Some of her best racing performances where in 2006 when she won her two gold medals in the Super-G-Sitting (time 1:33.88) and Downhill-Sitting (time 1:46.86). In 2006 Stephens was also nominated for an Excellence in Sports Performance Yearly Award as Best Female Athlete with a Disability. In the 2018 PyeongChang games Laurie Stephens won a bronze medal for the US in alpine skiing using a mono-ski, her time was 1:35.8. In 2018 she also placed 4th in the Super combined-Sitting, 5th in the Super-G-Sitting and Slalom-Sitting, 7th in Giant Slalom-Sitting. Stephens also has competed for the United States in Paralympic swimming she held two records on in the 100-meter backstroke and one in the 200-meter backstroke.

She won the gold medal in the women's giant slalom sitting para-alpine skiing event at the 2021 World Para Snow Sports Championships.

Education 
Outside of sports she studied therapeutic recreation at the University of New Hampshire.

References

External links 
 
 

Paralympic alpine skiers of the United States
Alpine skiers at the 2006 Winter Paralympics
Alpine skiers at the 2010 Winter Paralympics
Paralympic gold medalists for the United States
Paralympic silver medalists for the United States
Paralympic bronze medalists for the United States
People with spina bifida
People with paraplegia
University of New Hampshire alumni
People from Wenham, Massachusetts
1984 births
Living people
Medalists at the 2006 Winter Paralympics
Medalists at the 2014 Winter Paralympics
American female alpine skiers
Medalists at the 2010 Winter Paralympics
Medalists at the 2018 Winter Paralympics
Paralympic medalists in alpine skiing
Sportspeople from Essex County, Massachusetts
21st-century American women